Large aquaria exhibit a large number of species and animals in a large range of tanks. These tend to be public aquaria and may also be oceanaria and dolphinaria, in order to exhibit a wide range of different marine animals for the public. Some have even come to attain world records for their capacities.

In operation 
Only aquaria with a total capacity of more than 10 million litres and/or a tank larger than 5 million litres are included in the list. The list is not necessarily complete; aquaria that may meet the criteria but do not have published sources on their capacity may not be reflected in the list.

Under construction

See also 

 List of aquaria
 List of former zoos and aquariums
 List of dolphinariums
 List of zoos by country

References 

Lists of aquaria
Lists of largest buildings and structures